, Sony's PlayStation 2 is the best-selling video game console of all time.

Cumulative shipment totals in millions (sold-through, after March 2007)

Launch
The PS2 sold slightly more than 500,000 units on its first day, in October 2000. This marked an industry record for the fastest-selling game console. Sony planned to ship 100,000 units per week for the remainder of the year, for a total of 1.3 million by the end of the year. It planned to ship three million units by the end of the March of the following year.

Further years

Sony had shipped 10 million consoles to North America by May 2002. Lifetime sales reached 30 million by August 2002.  Holiday 2002 sales were strong at 8.5 million units in November and December. This was up 24% from the previous year.

Sony expected shipments in 2003 to slip from previous years. Sony projected shipments of 20 million, versus 22.5 the year before. Sony had shipped 60 million units as of September 2003. 26.4 million units went to North America, 19.4 million to Europe, and the "vast majority" of the remaining 14.2 went to Japan.

In 2004, although the console took a hit in holiday 2003 sales from the previous year, lifetime sales reached 70 million.

On November 29, 2005, the PlayStation 2 became the fastest game console to reach 100 million units shipped, accomplishing the feat within 5 years and 9 months from its launch. This achievement occurred faster than its predecessor, the PlayStation, which took 9 years and 6 months to reach the same benchmark.

In Europe, the PS2 sold 6 million units in 2006 and 3.8 million in 2007, according to estimates by EA. In 2007, the PS2 sold 3.97 million units in the US according to the NPD Group and 816,419 units in Japan according to Enterbrain.

In 2008, the PS2 sold 480,664 units in Japan, according to Enterbrain. As of October 2008, the system had sold 21 million units in Japan.

Over 150 million units of PS2 hardware had been sold worldwide as of the end of 2010, although GameInformer noted that this was only for units sold to retail companies.

PlayStation 2 shipments in Japan ended on December 28, 2012. A week later, on January 4, 2013, Sony Computer Entertainment formally discontinued the console.

In its last week of availability in Japan (December 24 to December 30, 2012), the PlayStation 2 sold 2,078 units in the country – up from 928 units the week before. Remarkably, the PlayStation 2 managed to sell better in Japan that week than the Xbox 360 (1,986 units), as well as the Nintendo DS (704 units).

Lifetime sales
The PS2 has sold over 158 million units worldwide as of January, 2013. In Europe, it has sold 55.28 million units as of January, 2013 according to Sony Computer Entertainment Europe, while in North America, it has sold 53.65 million units as of January, 2013. In Japan, the PS2 has sold 23.18 million units as of January, 2013, according to Famitsu/Enterbrain.

References

Sales
Video game console sales